The  is a Buddhist temple located in the city of Kokubunji, Tokyo, Japan, belonging to the Shingon-shu Buzan-ha sect. It claims to be the successor to the original Nara period  provincial temple ("kokubunji") of former Musashi Province which fell into ruins sometime in the Kamakura period. The Nara-period temple ruins were designated a National Historic Site in 1921, with the area under protection extended in 1976, 1979 and 2010 as archaeological excavations revealed more of its ruins.

Ancient Musashi Kokubun-ji

The Musashi Kokubun-ji and its associated Musashi Kokubun-niji occupy a combined site extending 1500 meters from east-to-west by 1000 meters north-to-south, with the route of the Musashi extension of the Tōsandō highway (東山道武蔵路) passing through the center of the site. The Tōsandō was one of the ancient highways of Japan, connecting the capital at Nara (and later Kyoto) with the northern tip of Honshu via the mountainous central provinces. However, the Tōsandō itself did not pass through Musashi Province, and this branch road connected the nearby Musashi Kokufu provincial capital with the highway. The Musashi Kokubun-ji was located on the west side of the highway and the Musashi Kokubun-nji was located on the east. Archaeological excavations of the Musashi Kokubun-ji have been ongoing for decades, and much of the core of the temple has been uncovered, including the foundations of the  Kondō, Lecture Hall, North Chapel, East Chapel, Middle Gate, and the Seven-story Pagoda. The complex as completed between 750 and 760 AD, and was on an unusually large scale, with the precincts rivaling Todai-ji in Nara in size The Kondo was a 7-bay building with a front of 36 meters. Per then Shoku Nihon Kōki, the pagoda was destroyed by lightning in 835 AD and was rebuilt in 845 AD. The temple was destroyed in 1333 during the Battle of Bubaigawara, which was part of the Genkō War to overthrow the Kamakura shogunate. The site is now preserved as an archaeological park.

Ancient Musashi Kokubun-niji
The ruins of the nunnery associated with the Musashi Kokubun-ji are on a much smaller scale, and in a poor state of preservation. The foundations of the Kondō, Middle Gate and part of the nun's residence have been identified, along with a portion of the palisade which once surrounded the complex. However, ruins of the South Gate, Bellfry and other structures appear to have been due to urban encroachment.

Modern Musashi Kokubun-ji
The modern Musashi Kokubun-ji is located on a portion of the site. It claims to have been rebuilt by Nitta Yoshisada in 1335, and its main image Yakushi Nyōrai dates from the late Heian period to early Kamakura period and may be a survivor of the original temple. It is a National Important Cultural Property.  The temple was reconstructed in 1751-1763.

See also
Provincial temple
List of Historic Sites of Japan (Tōkyō)

References

External links

Official home page 
Kokubunji City home page 
Kokubun-ji temple remains Museum

Buddhist temples in Tokyo
Nara period
Kokubunji, Tokyo
History of Tokyo
Historic Sites of Japan
Musashi Province
8th-century establishments in Japan
8th-century Buddhist temples
Buddhist archaeological sites in Japan